Giclas 29-38, also known as ZZ Piscium, is a variable white dwarf star of the DAV (or ZZ Ceti) type,
whose variability is due to large-amplitude, non-radial pulsations known as gravity waves.  It was first reported to be variable by Shulov and Kopatskaya in 1974.  DAV stars are like normal white dwarfs but have luminosity variations with amplitudes as high as 30%, arising from a superposition of vibrational modes with periods from 100 to 1,000 seconds.  Large-amplitude DAVs generally differ from lower-amplitude DAVs by having lower temperatures, longer primary periodicities, and many peaks in their vibrational spectra with frequencies which are sums of other vibrational modes.

G29-38, like other complex, large-amplitude DAV variables, has proven difficult to understand.    The power spectrum or periodogram of the light curve varies over times which range from weeks to years.  Usually, one strong mode dominates, although many smaller-amplitude modes are often observed.  The larger-amplitude modes, however, fluctuate in and out of observability; some low-power areas show more stability.  Asteroseismology uses the observed spectrum of pulsations from stars like G29-38 to infer the structure of their interiors.

Debris disk
The circumstellar environment of G29-38 first attracted attention in the late 1980s during a near-infrared survey of 200 white dwarfs conducted by Ben Zuckerman and Eric Becklin to search for low mass companion stars and brown dwarfs.  G29-38 was shown to radiate substantial emission between 2 and 5 micrometres, far in excess of that expected from extrapolation of the visual and near infrared spectrum of the star. Like other young, hot white dwarfs, G29-38 is thought to have formed relatively recently (600 million years ago) from its AGB progenitor, and therefore the excess was naturally explained by emission from a Jupiter-like brown dwarf with a temperature of 1200 K and a radius of 0.15 solar radius.  However, later observations, including speckle interferometry, failed to detect a brown dwarf.

Infrared observations made in 2004 by NASA's Spitzer Space Telescope indicated the presence of a dust cloud around G29-38, which may have been created by tidal disruption of an exocomet passing close to the white dwarf.  This may mean that G29-38 is still orbited by a ring of surviving comets and, possibly, outer planets.  This is the first observation supporting the idea that comets persist to the white dwarf stage of stellar evolution.

References

External links
 

Pulsating white dwarfs
Pisces (constellation)
Piscium, ZZ